Mark Anderson (born 16 November 1991) is a male Belizean sprinter. He competed in the Men's  100 metres event at the 2015 World Championships in Athletics in Beijing, China.

See also
 Belize at the 2015 World Championships in Athletics

References

Belizean male sprinters
Living people
Place of birth missing (living people)
1991 births
World Athletics Championships athletes for Belize
Athletes (track and field) at the 2014 Commonwealth Games
Commonwealth Games competitors for Belize
Athletes (track and field) at the 2015 Pan American Games
Pan American Games competitors for Belize
Central American Games silver medalists for Belize
Central American Games medalists in athletics